Chris Lilik is a political activist from the U.S. state of Pennsylvania.

Of Polish, Pennsylvania Dutch, and Ukrainian descent, he  attended Villanova University and law school at Duquesne University.

He interned for J.C. Watts. He is editor of the Pennsylvania political news website GrassrootsPA.com and is state chairman of the Young Conservatives of Pennsylvania.

In 2004, BusinessWeek called him a "one-man political action committee." He was a grassroots organizer for Pat Toomey's 2004 primary race against Arlen Specter. In 2010, Politics Magazine named him one of the most influential Republicans in Pennsylvania, describing his website as "Pennsylvania's Drudge Report."

References

External links
GrassrootsPA

Year of birth missing (living people)
Living people
Political activists from Pennsylvania
American people of Polish descent
American people of Pennsylvania Dutch descent
American people of Ukrainian descent
Villanova University alumni
Duquesne University alumni